Scincella doriae, also known commonly as Doria's ground skink and Doria's smooth skink,  is a species of lizard in the family Scincidae. The species is native to Southeast Asia.

Etymology
The specific name, doriae, is in honor of Italian zoologist Giacomo Doria.

Geographic range
A. doriae is found in China (Sichuan, Yunnan), Myanmar, Thailand, and Vietnam.

Habitat

Description

Reproduction
The mode of reproduction of S. doriae is unknown.

References

Further reading
Boulenger GA (1887). "An account of the Scincoid Lizards collected in Burma, for the Genoa Civic Museum, by Messrs. G. B. Comotto and L. Fea". Annali del Museo Civico di Storia Naturale di Genova, Serie Seconda 4: 618–624. (Lygosoma doriæ, new species, p. 620).
Boulenger GA (1890). The Fauna of British India, Including Ceylon and Burma. Reptilia and Batrachia. London: Secretary of State for India in Council. (Taylor and Francis, printers). xviii + 541 pp. (Lygosoma doriæ, p. 201).
Schmidt KP (1927). "Notes on Chinese Reptiles". Bulletin of the American Museum of Natural History 54 (4): 467–551. (''Leiolopisma doriæ, new combination, p. 502).

Scincella
Reptiles described in 1887
Taxa named by George Albert Boulenger